Karin Dedler (born February 2, 1963 in Dietmannsried) is a retired German alpine skier.  She won a bronze medal for downhill skiing in the 1989 world championships of skiing. She competed in the women's combined at the 1988 Winter Olympics.

References

1963 births
Living people
German female alpine skiers
Olympic alpine skiers of West Germany
Alpine skiers at the 1988 Winter Olympics
20th-century German women